This is a list of current, past and upcoming programs broadcast by BBC America.

Current programming

Original programming

Comedy
 Ten Percent (2022)

From The BBC

Unscripted

Docuseries
 Frozen Planet II (2023)

Upcoming programming

In development

Drama
Untitled Killing Eve spin-off

Former programming

Original programming

Drama
 Copper (2012–2013)
 Dirk Gently's Holistic Detective Agency (2016–2017)
 Fleming: The Man Who Would Be Bond (2014)
 Intruders (2014)
 Killing Eve (2018–2022)
 Orphan Black (2013–2017)
 The Split (season 3) (2022)
 The Watch (2021)

Comedy
 Almost Royal (2014–2016)

Unscripted

Docuseries
 Africa's Wild Year (2022)
 Baby Chimp Rescue (2020)
 Earth's Great Seasons (2020)
 Meerkat Manor: Rise of the Dynasty (2021)

Reality
 Gizmodo: The Gadget Testers (2013)
 Mud, Sweat & Gears (2015)
 No Kitchen Required (2012)
 Richard Hammond's Crash Course (2012)

Variety
 Factomania (2014)
 Top Gear America (season 1) (2017)

From The BBC

Drama
 Doctor Who
 Mood
 Ripper Street
 Sherlock
 Silent Witness

Comedy
 Criptales
 Monty Python's Flying Circus

Unscripted

Docuseries

 A Perfect Planet
 Africa
 Atlantic: The Wildest Ocean on Earth
 Attenborough in Paradise
 The Blue Planet
 Blue Planet II
 David Attenborough's Natural Curiosities
 Dynasties
 Great Bear Stakeout 
 Hidden Kingdoms
 The Hunt
 Jaguar's: Brazil's Supercat
 Madagascar
 Monkey Planet
 Nature's Weirdest Events
 Operation Arctic
 Operation Snow Tiger
 Penguins: Spy In The Huddle
 Planet Earth
 Reindeer Family and Me
 The Science Of Big Cats
 Seven Worlds, One Planet
 Shark
 Snow Chick: A Penguin's Tale
 The Snow Wolf: A Winter's Tale
 Spy In The Snow
 Weird Wonders of the World
 Wild Africa: Enchanted Kingdom
 Wild Arabia
 Wild France
 Wild Patagonia
 Yellowstone

Variety
 The Graham Norton Show
 Top Gear

Syndicated programming

A

 Absolutely Fabulous (1998–2013; 2016)
 The Accidental Angler (2007–2011)
 A Discovery of Witches (2019)
 After Henry (1998–2006)
 After You've Gone (2007–2010; 2014)
 Agatha Christie's Poirot (1998–2012; 2014–2017)
 Airport (1998–2009; 2012–2013)
 Alan Davies' Teenage Revolution (2011–2014)
 Alas Smith and Jones (1998–2008)
 Alexei Sayle's Stuff (1998–2008)
 Alistair McGowan's Big Impression (2000–2006)
 All Creatures Great and Small (1998–2007)
 'Allo 'Allo! (1998–2007)
 Almost Royal (2014–2016)
 Angels (1998–2008)
 Animal Park (2000–2019)
 Antiques Roadshow (2012–2018)
 Any Dream Will Do (2007–2015)
 The Apprentice (2005–2017)
 Are You Being Served? (1998–2008)
 The Armstrong and Miller Show (2008–2013; 2014–2015)
 As Time Goes By (1998–2007)
 The Avengers (1998–2007)

B

 Backup (1998–2008)
 Ballet Shoes (1998–2006)
 Bargain Hunt (2007–2019)
 BBC World News (1999–2019)
 BBC World News America (1999–2019)
 Beast (2000–2007)
 Bedlam (2012–2016)
 Being Human (2009–2013)
 Bellamy's People (2010–2014)
 Ben Elton: The Man from Auntie (2001–2009; 2013)
 The Ben Elton Show (1998–1999; 2010–2014)
 The Benny Hill Show (1998–2006)
 Bergerac (1998–2008)
 The Best of Tommy Cooper (1998–2005)
 Big Deal (1998–2004)
 Big Train (1999–2009)
 Bill Hicks: One Night Stand (1998–1999; 2014)
 Black Books (2001–2014)
 Blackadder (1998–2008)
 Blake's 7 (1998–2005)
 Blandings (2013–2016)
 The Bob Monkhouse Show (1998–2005)
 Bones
 Bottom (1998–2011)
 Bottom Live 2001: An Arse Oddity (2002; 2014–2015)
 Bottom Live (1998–2013)
 Bravestarr (1998–2004)
 Bread (1998–2008)
 Britain's Missing Top Model (2010–2018)
 The Brittas Empire (1998–2005)
 Broadchurch (2014–2019)
 Bromwell High (2005–2013)
 Bullseye (1998–2003)
 Burn Notice (2011–2017)
 Butterflies (1998–2004)

C

 Campion (1998–2008)
 The Canterbury Tales (2004–2011)
 The Catherine Tate Show (2005–2017)
 Carrott Confidential (1998–2005)
 Carrott's Lib (1998–2005)
 Carry On Laughing (1998–2004)
 Cash in the Attic (2007–2020)
 Casualty (1998–2019)
 Catherine Tate's Nan (2010–2017)
 Celebrity Masterchef (2010–2018)
 Celebrity Masterchef USA (2013–2018)
 Changing Rooms (1998–2009)
 Chef! (1998–2005)
 The Chinese Detective (1998–2006)
 The Choir (2007–2015)
 Citizen Khan (2012–2018)
 Citizen Smith (1998–2005)
 Class (2017–2019)
 The Closer (2016–2017)
 Cold Case (2008–2013)
 Cold Feet (1998–2010)
 Colditz (1998–2004)
 Come Dine with Me (2013–2019)
 Come Fly with Me (2011–2016)
 Comedy Connections (2003–2009)
 The Comedy Genius of John Sullivan (2012–2013; 2016)
 Comic Roots (1998–2004)
 Commercial Breakdown (1998–2011)
 Coupling (2001–2009)
 Cowboys (1998–2004)
 Cracker (1998–2011)
 Creature Comforts (2004–2014)
 CSI: Miami (2010–2018)

D

 Dad's Army (1998–2009)
 Dangerfield (1998–2008)
 Dave's One Night Stand (2011–2014)
 Demons (2014–2019)
 The Detectives (1998–2008)
 The Dick Emery Show (1998–2010)
 dinnerladies (1999–2005)
 DIY SOS (2000–2019)
 Dog Eat Dog (2007–2013)
 Don't Tell the Bride (2012–2018)
 Dragons' Den (2005–2019)

E

 Early Doors (2003–2013)
 EastEnders (1998–2003; 2013-2019)
 Escape to the Country (2008–2019)
 Ever Decreasing Circles (1998–2008)
 Extras (2005–2009)

F

 The Fades (2012–2016)
 The Fast Show (1998–2008)
 Father Ted (1998–2009)
 Fawlty Towers (1998–2008)
 Filthy, Rich and Catflap (1998–2008)
 First of the Summer Wine (1998–2006)
 Frank Stubbs Promotes (1998–1999; 2009)
 Friday Night Dinner (2012–2018)
 Friday Night with Jonathan Ross (2001–2017)
 Funny as Hell (2010–2019)

G

 Game On (1998–2009)
 Garden Rivals (2004–2018)
 Gavin & Stacey (2008–2017)
 Getting On (2009–2014)
 Goodness Gracious Me (1998–2009)
 Gordon Ramsay's F Word (2014–2019)
 Grange Hill (1998–2009; 2011)
 The Green Green Grass (2005–2012)
 The Good Life (1998–2008)
 Ground Force America (2000–2019)
 Ground Force (1999–2019)

H

 Hamish Macbeth (1998–2005)
 Harry Enfield and Chums (1998–2009)
 Have I Got News for You (1998–2018)
 Hex (2006-2007; 2013–2019)
 Hi-De-Hi! (1998–2010)
 Holby City (1999–2019)
 Holiday Showdown (2004–2012)
 Hotel Babylon (2007–2013)
 The Hour (2012–2015)
 House of Fools (2014–2017)
 How Clean Is Your House? (2004–2012)

I

 I'd Do Anything (2009-2010; 2016–2018)
 I'm Alan Partridge (1998–2009)
 The Inbetweeners (2010–2016)
 Inspector Morse (1998–2009)

J

 Jack Dee's Happy Hour (2000–2004; 2011; 2014)
 Jam (2001–2007)
 James May at the Edge of Space (2009–2014)
 James May on the Moon (2010–2013)
 James May's Toy Stories (2005–2017)
 Jeeves and Wooster (1998–2008)
 Jekyll (2011–2012)
 Jonathan Creek (1998–2018)
 Josh (2016–2019)
 Just for Laughs (2012–2017)
 Just Good Friends (1998–2009)

K

 Ken Dodd's World of Laughter (1998–2005)
 A Kick Up the Eighties (1998–2006)
 Keeping Up Appearances (1998–2009)
 Kinsey (1998–2006) 
 Kitchen Nightmares (2010–2019)
 The Kit Curran Radio Show (2001–2007)
 The Kumars at No. 42 (2002–2011)

L

 A Life of Grime (2000–2011)
 Last of The Summer Wine (1998–2012)
 Law & Order: Criminal Intent (2012–2021)
 Law & Order: UK (2009–2017)
 Law & Order
 The League of Gentlemen (1999–2006)
 The Lenny Henry Show (1998–2013)
 Let Them Eat Cake (1999–2005)
 The Life of Rock with Brian Pern (2014–2018)
 Life Without George (1998–2007)
 The Likely Lads (1998–2008)
 Limmy's Show (2010–2016)
 Linda Green (2002–2006)
 Little Britain (2004–2017)
 Live at the Apollo (2004–2019)
 London's Burning (1998–2007)
 Look Around You (2003–2008)
 Lovejoy (1998–2007)
 Lucky Feller (1998–2009)

M

 The Making of Me (2010)
 Man vs. Wild (2015–2016)
 Manchild (2013–2016)
 Men Behaving Badly (1998–2009)
 Miranda (2010–2017)
 Monarch of the Glen (1998–2009)
 Morgana Robinson's The Agency (2016–2017; 2018)
 Mrs Brown's Boys (2011–2019)
 Murphy's Law (2005–2014)
 My Family (2000–2009)
 My Hero (2000–2009)

N

 Nanny (1998–2007)
 Nathan Barley (2006–2009)
 Neighbours (1998–2008)
 The New Statesman (1998–2007)
 Nighty Night (2004–2012)
 Not Going Out (2006–2019)
 Not the Nine O'Clock News (1998–2008)
 Nurse (2015–2017)

O

 The Office (2001–2016)
 Oh, Brother! (1998–2008)
 The Old Guys (2009–2012; 2015)
 On Thin Ice (2009–2012)
 One Foot in the Grave (1998–2008)
 Only Fools and Horses (1998–2015)
 Open All Hours (1998–2009)
 Operation Good Guys (1998–2002; 2006–2007)
 Outnumbered (2007–2018)

P

 Parkinson (1998–2008)
 Peep Show (2006–2014)
 The Persuaders! (1998–2008)
 Pie in the Sky (1998–2007)
 The Piglet Files (1998–2008)
 Planet Earth (2006–2012; 2013) 
 Poldark (1998–2006)
 Porridge (1998–2009)
 Pramface (2012–2016)
 Primeval (2005–2018)
 The Prisoner (1998–2007)
 Private Schulz (1998–2006)
 Psychoville (2009–2014)
 Pulling (2007–2011; 2012)

R

 Red Dwarf (1998–2019)
 Rentaghost (1998–2005)
 Rex the Runt (1999–2005)
 Ripping Yarns (1998–2008)
 Rising Damp (1998–2005)
 Rizzoli & Isles (2017–2021)
 Robin Hood (2007–2013)
 Rock and Chips (2010–2013)
 Rock Profile (2000–2004; 2008–2011)
 Rockface (2002–2008)
 The Rolling Stones: Truth and Lies (1999)
 The Royle Family (1998–2015; 2016–2017)

S

 The Saint (1998–2008)
 Saxondale (2006–2009; 2014)
 Seven of One (1998–2007)
 Sharpe (1998–2013)
 A Sharp Intake of Breath (1998–2009)
 Shooting Stars (1998–2014)
 Smack the Pony (2000–2011)
 The Smell of Reeves and Mortimer (1999–2004)
 Solo (1998–2006)
 Sorry! (1998–2006)
 Spaced (2001–2013)
 Star Stories (2008–2015)
 Star Trek
 Star Trek: Deep Space Nine
 Star Trek: The Next Generation 
 Star Trek: Voyager
 State of Play (2004–2014)
 The State Within (2007)
 Stay Lucky (1998–2006)
 Stella Street (1998–2004; 2007)
 Steve Coogan: The Inside Story (2010; 2014)
 Still Open All Hours (2014–2019)
 Survivors (2009–2017)
 Sykes (1998–2005)

T

 Taggart (1998–2013)
 The Thick of It (2005–2015)
 The Thin Blue Line (1998–2009)
 This Life (1998–2005)
 Top Gear (2002–2019)
 Top of The Pops (1998–2018)
 Torchwood (2007–2016)
 Trailer Park Boys (2002–2008)
 The Trip (2011–2019)
 Trust (2006–2014)

U

 University Challenge (1998–2019)
 Upstart Crow (2016–2019)

V

 Velvet Soup (2002–2006)
 The Vicar of Dibley (1998–2013; 2014–2015; 2018)

W

 Wallace & Gromit (1998–2016)
 The Weakest Link (2000–2019)
 Whose Line Is It Anyway? (1998–2016)
 Wire in the Blood (2003–2010)

X
 The X-Files (1998–2019)

Y
 The Young Ones (1998–2009)

See also
 List of programs broadcast by the BBC
 List of programs broadcast by BBC Canada

References

External links

bbcamerica.com, shows
bbcamerica.com, coming soon

BBC America

BBC America